Better Living Through Chemistry is the debut studio album by English electronic music producer Fatboy Slim. It was released on 23 September 1996 in the United Kingdom by Skint Records and in the United States by Astralwerks. It was Fatboy Slim's first work to chart outside of the UK, with the single "Going Out of My Head" notably charting in the US, and was certified gold by the BPI.

Background

Skint Records founder Damian Harris has described the album as having been "more of a compilation than an album", as some of the tracks had been recorded some time before its release, due to Norman Cook's other musical projects. Three songs from the album were previously released in Skint's first volume of their Brassic Beats compilation album series, which is advertised in the album's booklet.

The album's cover features an image of a 3.5-inch floppy disk, paying homage to the cover of New Order's "Blue Monday" single, which featured a 5.25-inch disk. The album's title is a variation of a DuPont advertising slogan, "Better Things for Better Living...Through Chemistry".

Critical reception

The album received generally positive reviews from critics. A 1997 review from Rolling Stone claimed the album to be "of the most fun, shamelessly genre-hopping dance albums of the year". AllMusic rated it four stars out of five, recommending the album to "those who can't get enough of the popular technoid-sampled alternative dance style of the late '90s".

Legacy
The album was included in the book 1001 Albums You Must Hear Before You Die.

In popular culture
The song "Give the Po' Man a Break" is featured in the 2000 film Traffic.

The song "The Weekend Starts Here" is featured in the first episode of the British sitcom Spaced.

Track listing

Charts

Certifications

References

External links
 

1996 debut albums
Fatboy Slim albums
Astralwerks albums
Skint Records albums